Ferdinand Henry "Ferd" "Dunc" Duncan (June 7, 1896 – September 8, 1976) was an American college football player. He was later a traveling salesman.

Duncan played football at the University of South Dakota, where he was captain of the 1916 team. He was a prominent end for the Florida Gators of the University of Florida. Coach William G. Kline brought in players from "the University of Oklahoma and the western states" such as Duncan and Ark Newton upon his arrival.  He scored all of Florida's points in one of the programs first big victories, over Alabama in 1921. Coach Stegeman of Georgia wrote in Spalding's Football Guide that year "Florida, for the first time, had a strong team."

Duncan was then captain of the 1922 Florida team, ranked by  Spalding's Football Guide as the best forward passing team in the country. It was also the first Florida team to play Harvard. In that game, "Robinson and Duncan  stood out all afternoon." He scored all of the points in the win over Oglethorpe. An all-time Florida team selected by George Trevor in 1935 puts Duncan at first team end, opposite Dale Van Sickel. Duncan was also a forward on the basketball team.

References

External links
 

1896 births
1976 deaths
American football ends
American men's basketball players
Forwards (basketball)
Florida Gators football players
Florida Gators men's basketball players
South Dakota Coyotes football players
People from Minnehaha County, South Dakota
Players of American football from Richmond, Virginia
Basketball players from Richmond, Virginia
Players of American football from South Dakota
Basketball players from South Dakota